Yvonne Rothemund (born 23 September 1992) is a German ice hockey player for ESC Planegg and the German national team.

She participated at the 2015 IIHF Women's World Championship.

References

External links

1992 births
Living people
German women's ice hockey defencemen
People from Kulmbach
Sportspeople from Upper Franconia